Le chant du Styrène (lit. "The Song of Styrene") is a 13-minute long French documentary film from 1958. It was directed by Alain Resnais for the French industrial group Pechiney to highlight the merits of plastics. The narration spoken by Pierre Dux is a poem written by Raymond Queneau, all in alexandrines, whose title is a pun on the phonetic resemblance of "styrene" to "siren".

External links
 
 Full text by Raymond Queneau 

1958 films
Films directed by Alain Resnais
1950s short documentary films
French short documentary films
Plastics industry
1958 documentary films
Sponsored films
Promotional films
1950s French films